Arroz Con Leche is the debut studio album by Mexican rock band Panda. It was released on September 2, 2000 through independent record label Movic Records. The album was produced by Alan Mason. It was re-issued as a VCD after the moderate success of follow-up, La Revancha Del Príncipe Charro in 2002, due to poor album sales.

Background

The record includes 12 songs, which were chosen from among several songs from their Demo 1997. It was recorded in the Kaura Recording's Studio Garza, under the executive production of Alan Mason and assistance in recording by Adrián "Rojo" Treviño. The producer pushed the band to give their songs a little more pop-leaning influence to their punk sound.

The singles chosen to promote the album were "Buen Día", "Si Supieras", "Muñeca" and "Te Invito A Mi Fiesta".

Unfortunately, it went unnoticed in the record stores and critics alike, but after the success of their second album, La Revancha Del Príncipe Charro, they launched a reissue of their debut album in 2002. This disc contained the original songs from their first album along with new extras in the CD: wallpapers, games, discography, lyrics, music and screensavers.

Credits
Credits adapted from AllMusic.

Panda
 José Madero – lead vocals, guitar
 Jorge "Ongi" Garza – guitar, backing vocals
 Ricardo Treviño – bass, backing vocals
 Jorge "Kross" Vázquez – drums, backing vocals
Additional personnel
 De La Garza – executive producer
 Alan Mason – producer
 Alan Mason – engineer, producer
 CDM (Fusión Global Jr.) – mixing, recording
 Cha – typography
 Jacobo Parra – photography
 Mario Videgaray – art direction, graphic design

Track listing
All tracks written by José Madero

 El Elías ("Elias")
 Tanto ("Too Much")
 Miércoles ("Wednesday")
 En El Vaticano ("In The Vatican")
 Sunny Blue
 "Buen Día" ("Good Day")
 "Sweater Geek"
 "Sí Supieras" ("If You Only Knew")
 "El Gran McGee" ("The Great McGee")
 "Muñeca" ("Babydoll")
 "Gripa y Mundial" ("Flu and The World Cup")
 "Te Invito A Mi Fiesta" ("I Invite You To My Party")

References

2000 albums
Panda (band) albums